Pat Moran (born 2 April 1998) is an Ireland international rugby league footballer who plays as a  for the SO Avignon in the Elite One Championship.

He previously played for the Warrington Wolves in the Betfred Super League, and spent time on loan from Warrington at the Rochdale Hornets and the Sheffield Eagles in the Championship. Moran has also played for the Widnes Vikings in the second tier and for SO Avignon in the Elite One Championship.

Background
Moran is of Irish heritage.

Career
In 2018 he made his Challenge Cup début for Warrington against the Bradford Bulls.

Widnes Vikings
On 22 Oct 2019 it was reported that he had signed for the Widnes Vikings in the RFL Championship.

Sporting Olympique Avignon
On 27 Jan 2021 it was reported that he had signed for Sporting Olympique Avignon in the Elite One Championship.

London Broncos
On 26 May 2021 it was reported that he had signed for the London Broncos in the RFL Championship.

Newcastle Thunder
On 5 Nov 2021 it was reported that he had signed for Newcastle Thunder in the RFL Championship

References

External links
Warrington Wolves profile

1998 births
Living people
English rugby league players
Ireland national rugby league team players
London Broncos players
Newcastle Thunder players
Rochdale Hornets players
Rugby league props
Sheffield Eagles players
Sporting Olympique Avignon players
Warrington Wolves players
Widnes Vikings players